is a syllable in the Javanese script that represents the sound /kɔ/, /ka/. It is transliterated to Latin as "ka", and sometimes in Indonesian orthography as "ko".

Pasangan 
Its pasangan form , is located on the bottom side of the previous syllable. For example,  - anake (his/her child), which, although transliterated with a single 'k', is written using double '' because the rootword ('anak', child) ends in ''.

For example,  - anakku (my child)

Extended form 

Using cecak telu, the syllable represents Arabic  (/ħ/ or /x/).

 with a cerek is called Ka sasak.

Glyphs

Unicode block 

Javanese script was added to the Unicode Standard in October, 2009 with the release of version 5.2.

See also 
 Ka (Indic)
 Devanagari ka

References 

Javanese script